Tibor Szemző (born 1955, Budapest, Hungary) is a Hungarian composer, performer, media artist. His pieces often include spoken texts, film and other media. He creates installations and composes music for his own and others’ films. Ever since the beginning of his career, he has been performing actively and widely in Hungary and abroad as well.

Biography
Szemző was born in Budapest, into a middle-class family, declassed as a result of World War II and socialism. His family originates from former Upper Hungary. His musical training was conducted in accordance with the Kodály method. He attended an elementary school that specialised in music. Originally he studied fine mechanics at high school that he abandoned at the age of 17 to dedicate all of his time to instrumental studies. He completed the Bartók Béla Conservatory in two years and later studied at the Liszt Ferenc Academy of Music (1976–79). He earned a Media Design degree at the Moholy-Nagy University of Art and Design (2014) and pursued a DLA from the Hungarian Academy of Fine Arts (2017).

In 1973, he founded the Szemző Quartet (originally a trio) playing improvised chamber music, which later merged into Group 180.

Group 180 was founded in 1979 and was active until 1989. It was started by Szemző and his fellow students, friends (László Melis, András Soós, László Gőz). Group 180 played a prominent role in the distribution of international contemporary repetitive music in Hungary and disseminated Hungarian contemporary music abroad. The group achieved a remarkable domestic and international career. (During the ten years of its existence, the Group worked with such major figures of the genre as Frederic Rzewski, Steve Reich, Terry Riley, Alvin Curran, Phill Niblock, Arnold Dreyblatt, Peter Kotik or László Vidovszky.)

In addition, Szemző began his solo career in 1983. Besides his pieces composed for Group 180 in this period, he created Water Wonder, a piece involving live electronics.

From 1987 to 2003, London-based Leo Records released his recordings, occasionally in co-operation with Hungary-based Bahia Records. His first solo release was Snapshot from the Island in 1987.

His interest in cinematography was inspired by his ever-lasting collaboration with media artist Péter Forgács (Group 180's former narrator) and started with the compositions written for Forgács's films. Szemző began to create individual, music-based films in 1985, which is constantly present in his activity.

In 1986/87 he founded Fodderbasis, an open music ensemble. The group's projects were partly multimedia events. They produced some publications, in connection with Forgács's films.

In 1996, Szemző launched the Gordian Knot Creative Music Laboratory, which operated until 2007.

His highly successful and award-winning film was made about the life of Sándor Kőrösi Csoma, pilgrim, linguist and tibetologist. The film, titled A Guest of Life – Alexander Csoma de Kőrös (1999-2006)  is an intermix animation film and 8mm footage. Both the movie and its stage version are starred by actresses Susannah York and Mari Törőcsik.  The direct antecedents of the film were the Invisible Story (1996-2000) based on Béla Hamvas’ prose and The Other Shore (Japan, 1996). Other prominent pieces in Szemző's oeuvre are Tractatus based on Ludwig Wittgenstein’s Tractatus Logico-Philosophicus (1991-1995), the film Free Fall (1996), the Free Fall Oratorio (CD, 1999), and »K«Engravings, a multimedia-series on Franz Kafka,  covering the ten-year cycle between 2008 and 2018.

His regular co-operating partners include the Agon Orchestra from Prague, the Moyzes Quartet from Bratislava, Jenő Oláh's and János Sándor's Folk Ensemble, the Amadinda Percussion Group, the Moving House Company, the Moments Notice Trio, the Danubius Quartet, the Polish Teatr Ósmego Dnia association, the Opus Posth from Moscow and the Polish Camerata Vistula chamber music ensemble.

Since the early 80s, according to the typical art practice of the era, Szemző's musical activity has been open to other arts (especially literature and fine arts, besides cinematography and theatre), often experimented with the boundaries of different art forms. He has taken part in or created numerous performances. He also creates installations. He regularly worked together with the members of the Vajda Lajos Studio of Szentendre, and with János Szirtes, with whom he was also a member of the New Modern Acrobatics performance group (1987-1991). Szemző often worked with fine and oboe artist Gábor Roskó, as well as with fine artist Tamás Waliczky in the early 90s. In his creations, verbality, speech sound, multilingualism, and motion picture play an essential role in a close unity.

Music Compositions, Multimedia Pieces 

 Memory Shards  – Hommage á W.G. Sebald, In Memoriam MPÖ  2021 Two compositions for human voice, contra-alto flute and percussions with additional sounds
 Silverbird and the Cyclist – Alexander Csoma Arboretum  2020 cinematographic concert with narrator, vocal and instrumental soloist
 FLOW 2019 – 
 »K«Engravings 2008-2018 Nineteen Multimedia Composition for human voices, various instruments, and films (text by Franz Kafka)
 Earth Time 2017 installation for film and video projectors, human voices, and music (text by Danilo Kiš)
 Early Sorrows 2015 piece for radio, text by Danilo Kiš, script: Gábor Németh, requested by the Hungarian Radio
 Hourglass 2014 text by Danilo Kiš, for instruments and human voices
 Stonewall Cake 2013 cinematic music performance
 The Message – dr Kafka's Last Love 2013 cinematic theater performance script: András Forgách, requested by the Palace of Arts Budapest
 An Imperial Message – 2010/11 piece for radio, text by Franz Kafka, script: András Forgách, requested by the Hungarian Radio
 CSOMA – a cinematic opera 2008 for human voices, storyteller and chamber orchestra, with film screening, text by László Sári, requested by ERA New Horizons (Wroclaw, Poland) and Palace of Arts Budapest
 Hamlet 2007 chamber opera for three voice and small ensemble (text: W. Shakespeare) requested by National Theater, Szeged, Hungary
 What Do You See? 2005 for chamber ensemble and the voice of Géza Ottlik, requested by the Hungarian Radio
 Csoma-Legendry (script by László Sári) 2004 for chamber ensemble and human voices (requested by the Hungarian Radio)
 Danube Exodus: The Rippling Currents Of The River 2002 with Péter Forgács, Getty Museum, Los Angeles
 Arboretuum 2002 for chamber ensemble and voices (requested by Off Dance Company)
 South Of No North – The Children of the Kosovo War 2001, ten movements for various instruments and human voices
 The Invisible Story 1996-2000 7 sketches for the text of Béla Hamvas 1996-2000 for mixed ensemble and human voice
 The Other Shore 1997 multimedia performance for narrators, chamber ensemble and films (shooting of The Other Shore)
 Free Fall with Péter Forgács 1996 video-oratorio
 Way Through? 1996 for 8mm phone, voice and bass flute, with moving pictures
 Symultan 1995-96 for human voices and various sounds
 Tractatus 1991-95 for human voice, musicians and narrators
 33 Movements For String Quartet And Other Instruments 1994 for string quartet and various instruments
 Snap Two 1993 for bass flute, voice and electronics
 Gull 1992 choral variation for string quartet and tabla
 Quintet 1992 for table acrobat and string quartet
 Wittgenstein Tractatus 1991-92 with Péter Forgács 7 video movements
 Doppelkonzert 1989-91 installation-concerto for two performers, computer-driven synthesizers and radios requested by Soros Center/Budapest, Museum Moderner Kunst/Vienna
 Skullbase Fracture No.2. 1989 music / installation for 5 performers, Gypsy band, narrator and TV, cameraman and video (requested by Ars Electronica Festival ’89)
 Private Exits 1988-89 soundscapes for six performers and home movies, premiered at the Wiener Festwochen ’89 / Töne und Gegentöne, Vienna
 Private Hungary 1988 for 8mm phone, voice, flute and electronics, and home movies premiered at the Ars Electronica ’88 Festival (Linz Austria) with Péter Forgács
 Optimistic Lecture (In Memoriam Miklós Erdély) 1988 concertino for record-player and mixed ensemble
 Poisoned Idyll 1987 music installation for five Gypsy band
 Snapshot From The Island 1986 for bass flute and voice, tapes and electronics (with the home movies of Private Film Archive, Budapest)
 Watermusic 1985 installation for Gypsy band in small rowboats on the City Lake of Budapest
 Skullbase Fracture (text by P.Havliček) 1984 for narrator and TV, chamber ensemble and Gypsy band
 Traintrip 1983 for 21 instruments
 Water-Wonder 1982-83 for flutes and tape delay
 The Sex Appeal Of Death (In Memoriam T. Hajas) 1981 for chamber ensemble and child narrator

Films 

 Double Waves 15' (8mm / video) with János Sugár – Fodderbasis 2021
 Distance Predica 7 (8mm / video, BW) – Fodderbasis 2021 
 Substance of a Dream 15' (8mm / video) – Fodderbasis 2021
 Swier Batfilm 9' (8mm / video, BW) – Fodderbasis 2017
 We'd Laugh Together, Fool Around And Go Swimming 25’ (8mm / video) Budapest Film 2014
 The Tip Of The Iceberg 17' (8mm / video) – Gordioso Film / Duna Műhely 2011
 The Sex Appeal Of Death 12' (video) – Gordioso Film / Duna Műhely 1990/2010
 Invisible Story 27' (8mm / video) – Gordioso Film / Duna Műhely 2009
 A Guest Of Life - Alexander Csoma de Körös 78' (8 / 35mm, color) – Mediawave 2000 Kft. 2006
 What There Is 11' (8mm / video, BW) – Kép-Árnyék 2005
 In Memoriam Nikolai Dimitriev 5' (8mm / video, BW) – Fodderbasis 2004
 Cseke-clip 9' (8mm / video, BW) – Fodderbasis 2003
 The Csoma Story – First Sketch 7' (8mm / video) – Gordioso Film 2001
 The Other Shore 20' (8 / 35mm, color) – BBS / Duna Műhely 1998
 CUBA 32' (8 / 16mm, BW) – Balázs Béla Stúdió 1993
 Skullbase Fracture 20'1985  20’ (video) – Balázs Béla Stúdió 1985

Installations 

 Earth Time 2017 - National Museum, Oulu, Finland
 »K«engravings 2017 - Kassák Múzeum, Budapest
 K1 – Danilo Kiš Memorial Space 2014 multimedia installation, Moholy-Nagy University, Budapest 
 Invisible Story  2008 film and sound installation for the request of WRO Art Center, Wroclaw, Poland
 Late Mutant Reels 2005 for the request of Ernst Museum, Budapest 
 Loop 1998 film and sound installation for the St Pölten Sound Tower, for the request of Klangturm, St Pölten, Austria
 Another Shore – Engelspfad  1998 Sound installation for the Graben Plague Tower, Vienna, for the request of CBB / Easterfest '98, Vienna
 Transit 1993 installation for pocket radios (Kassel, Germany)

Music/Performances with Others 

 Accurate as the Atomic Clock 2019 New Modern Acrobatics, Miskolc
 The Hobby of The Woodcutter 2015 with József Tasnádi and Gábor Roskó, Budapest
 SZJ60 2014 with János Szirtes, László feLugossy, Beatrix Simkó, Zsolnay Quarter, Pécs, Hungary
 Barrels 2013 with András Böröcz at Vylyan Cellar, Villány, Hungary
 Stone-Bread 2009 with András Böröcz, Petőfi Literary Museum, Budapest
 Sunyi 1992 with Károly Minyó Szert at Ujlak / Budapest
 Trio 1992 with László feLugossy and János Szirtes at Helsinki / Finland
 Conversations / Interactive Sound And Picture 1991 with Tamás Waliczky at Étampes/France, Szkéné/Budapest (1992)
 Bones 1990 with János Szirtes and Péter Magyar at Hungarian Institut Sofia/Bulgaria
 Deathful Delay 1989 with Iván Angelus at Budapest, Salzburg, Berlin East/West
 Private Hungary 1988 with Péter Forgács at Ars Electronica ’88/Austria
 Comecon 1985 with Péter Forgács
 Iron Age 1985 with Péter Forgács at Ernst Museum
 Echo 1985 at Műcsarnok/Budapest, with Wolfgang Ernst and János Szirtes and 5 violin players
 Wonder Stag 1984 at Planum Festival, Budapest with János Szirtes and Jenő Menyhárt
 Free Style Swimming 1984 Kossuth Klub/Budapest with János Szirtes
 Plant 1983 with János Szirtes at Budapest and Breitenbrunn/Austria
 Avanti 1983 with János Szirtes
 Passing Sickness 1981 with János Szirtes at KEK/Budapest

Music for Theatre 

 Hamlet 2007 chamber opera for three voice and small ensemble requested by National Theater, Szeged, Hungary, directed by Péter Horváth)
 Arboretuum 2002 for chamber ensemble and voices (requested by Off Dance Company)
 Cekhov: The Gull 1992 theater piece (dir. István Bálint)
 Another Snap 1988 for dance performance (Elisa Monte Dance Company / NYC)
 Let's Go Out And Dance 1985 for shadowplay (Iván Angelus)
 Mirrors 1982 for dance theater (Iván Angelus)

Discography 
 SNAP #2 LP 2022 Fodderbasis FOB67
 ARBO X LP 2021 Fodderbasis FOB66
 Snapshot from the Island LP 2020 Fodderbasis FOB65
 CSOMA LP, 2019 Fodderbasis FB 063
 »K«engravings LP + films, 2018 Fodderbasis FB 062
 A Guest of Life-Alexander Csoma de Körös DVD 2008, Fantasy Film
 South Of No North CD 2003, Leo Records/Kbazovsky House CD LR 361
 The Danube Exodus CD 2002, Leo Records/Kbazovsky House CD LR 352
 Invisible Story CD 2001, Leo Records CD LR 311
 Sunset on Left CD 2000, Bahia Music CDB 071
 Another Shore CD (Angels as Pilots Anthology) 2000 Angel Lab, Austria
 Free Fall Oratorio CD 2000, author's edition, Fodderbasis  FOB 021
 The Other Shore CD 1999, Leo Records, London/Bahia Music CD LR 281
 Snapshot from the Island CD 1999 Leo Records/Bahia Music CD LR 277
 Tractatus Lullaby 1999 Schrattenberg Anthology, Austria
 Water Wonder CD (Gergely Ittzés: Solos) 1999 Hungaroton HCD 31785
 Relative Things CD 1998, Leo Records, London CD LR 250
 Symultan CD 1997 (Hungarian Soundscapes) Hungarian Radio, HEAR 101
 Tractatus CD 1995, Leo Records, London CD LR 227
 The Sex Appeal Of Death/Airy Wedding CD 1994 (Musicworks Magazine insert) Toronto, Canada
 The Last Hungarian Vinyl SP 1994, Takarmánybázis (Fodderbasis)
 Duo with Martin Groeneweld CD 1984 (Growthrings Anthology) Hermit Foundation, Czech Republic
 The Conscience: Narrative Chamber Pieces CD 1993, 1999 Leo Records/BBS/Bahia Music, London/Budapest CD LR 185
 Ain't Nothing But A Little Bit Of Music For Moving Pictures CD 1992 TomK Records/BBS, Prague, Czechoslovakia
 Sub-Carpathia CD (Looking East/Electronic East) 1981 Erdenklang, West-Germany
 Meteo/The Dreams of Eckermann LP 1990 Hunnia (with János Másik)
 Private Exits LP 1989 HPS
 Snapshot from the Island LP 1987, CD 1999 Leo Records, London
 Water Wonder No.1. LP,CD (Group 180) 1983 Hungaroton, SLPX HCD 12545

Actor 

 Tiszta lap / Clean Slate – Lord's Voice (directed by László feLugossy, János Szirtes, 2002)
 Aranymadár / Golden Bird – Narrator (directed by István Szaladják, 1999)
 Önuralom /Self-Control (directed by László feLugossy,1988)

Selected events
Opera Nova Festival, Prague 2019
Budapest Music Center 2013-2019
A38 Ship, Budapest 2003-2020
Palace of Arts Budapest 2008-2019
Buddhist International Film Festival 2009, Barbican Center, London
Kolkata International Film Festival 2007, India
Tribeca Film Festival, NYC 2007
Getty Museum, Los Angeles, 2002
Alternativa 2001, Moscow
San Francisco Jewish Film Festival
Angelica 2000, Bologna, Italia
Prague New Music Marathon ’96,’98, 2000
Unsung Music '96 and 2000, Queen Elizabeth Hall, London 
Warsaw Autumn Festival '95, Poland
Music Now from Hungary '94, Yokohama, Japan 
Ars Electronica '88 and '89, Linz, Austria
Wiener Festwochen '88
New Music America '86, Houston
Festival d'automne à Paris 1981

References

External links
 
 opac-nevter.pim.hu/en/record/-/record/PIM230025
 
 info.bmc.hu/index.php?node=artists&table=SZERZO&id=100
 www.discogs.com/artist/873058-Tibor-Szemz%C5%91
 https://www.facebook.com/Szemzoe/
 http://www.forgacspeter.hu/

1955 births
20th-century classical composers
21st-century classical composers
Hungarian classical composers
Hungarian male classical composers
Living people
20th-century Hungarian male musicians
21st-century Hungarian male musicians